Persimmon vinegar is a vinegar made from Oriental persimmon. Called gam-sikcho in Korean, it is a traditional condiment, food ingredient, and beverage base in Korean cuisine.

Persimmon vinegar is reported to help reduce liver cholesterol and prevent metabolic disorders induced by chronic alcohol intake.

Persimmon vinegar made with 'meoksi' persimmons, a native Korean variety with small, very sweet fruits with high tannin content, was included in the Ark of Taste catalogue of heritage foods in 2014.

References 

Korean condiments
Vinegar
Vinegar